Vikram Aur Betaal  is an Indian television series that aired on DD National in 1985 & re-telecast in 1988 after the hit Series Ramayan. The series contained stories from Indian mythology. The concept of the program was based on Baital Pachisi, a collection of tales and legends within a frame story, from India (a collection of 25 tales which is narrated by Vetala to Vikram). It is also known as Vikram-Betaal. It is about the legendary king Vikram (identified as Vikramāditya) and the ghost Betal (identified as Vetala, a spirit analogous to a vampire in western literature). The show aired at 4:30 PM Indian Standard Time on Sundays from 1985 to 1986.

Legend 

Vikram Aur Betaal is based on 'Betaal Pachisi', written in the 11th century by Kashmiri poet Somdev Bhatt. These are spellbinding stories told to the wise King Vikramaditya by the witty ghost Betaal.

Vikramaditya was a great king who ruled over a prosperous kingdom from his capital at Ujjain. He had immense love for learning as well as for adventure. He was brave, fearless, and with a strong will. Every day many visitors used to visit the king and gift him something. The King used to accept all the gifts with the same courtesy. Among such visitors was a mendicant who presented the king with fruit on every visit. King Vikramaditya used to hand over the fruit to the royal storekeeper. One day while handling the fruit, it broke and from the top came out a handy ball of a ruby. The King was surprised. He ordered to check all the fruits, and from all fruits came out a fine ruby. The King decided to meet the mendicant. However, the mendicant had set a condition that the King must meet him under a Banyan tree in the center of the cremation ground beyond the city, at night, on the 14th day of the dark half of the month. King met him as decided. The King asked the mendicant why he was doing this. The mendicant tells that there is a task that only a King like Vikramaditya can perform. King Vikramaditya had to visit the northernmost corner of this ground where he would find a very ancient tree. There would be a corpse hanging from one of its branches. He would have to fetch it for the mendicant, as the mendicant was seeking certain occult powers which he would get only if a king brought this particular corpse to him and if he would practice certain rites sitting on it.

According to the legend the King Vikramaditya, in order to fulfill a vow, was required to remove a corpse of Betaal from a treetop and carry it on his shoulder to another place in silence. En route, the spirit of Betaal (in the corpse) used to narrate a story to the king and after completing the story Betaal would pose a query that if he (The king) knew the answer, was bound to respond lest he will break his head into thousand pieces. But if he does speak out, he would break the vow of silence and Betaal would fly back to the treetop, leaving the king inches short of his destination! The king would go after the vampire and start all over again. And so on and so on and so on. As the name 'Betaal Pachisi' suggests the Betaal told King 25 stories. ('Pachisi' (Hindi) is derived from the word 'Pachis' in Hindi which means twenty-five) . However, looking at the determination of the king Vikramaditya, Betaal finally disclosed the true motive of the mendicant. The mendicant's plan was to practice certain rites sitting on Betaal but he would kill the King, to get all the powers of world. This created suspicion in Vikramaditya's mind. However, he still went to the mendicant, but he was prepared for a surprise. Betaal proved to be right and the mendicant tried to kill Vikramaditya. However, Vikramaditya outwitted the mendicant and killed him.

Cast

Main 
Arun Govil - as Vikram or King Vikramāditya
Sajjan - as Betaal or Vetala (ghost).

Episodic 
Arvind Trivedi - as the mendicant.
Deepika Chikhalia - in many roles.
Vijay Arora - in many roles.
Ramesh Bhatkar - in many roles.
Mulraj Rajda - in many roles.
 Rajnibala - in many roles.
Sunil Lahiri - in many roles.
Lilliput - in many roles.
Rama Vij - in many roles.
Satish Kaul - in many roles.
Surjeet Mohanty - in many roles.
Sameer Rajda - in many roles.

List of episodes

See also 
 Vikram Betaal Ki Rahasya Gatha
 Singhasan Battisi

References

External links 
 Sagar Arts - official Page 
 Melton Foundation
 
 Vikram Aur Betaal 1985

DD National original programming
Memorials to Vikramaditya
1985 Indian television series debuts
1980s Indian television series
Indian fantasy television series
Ghosts in television
Indian period television series
Television shows based on fairy tales
Indian television series about Hindu deities
Vampires in television